Ann Kim is a James Beard Award-winning chef and restaurateur in Minneapolis, Minnesota.

Early life
Kim immigrated from South Korea to the United States in 1977 at the age of four, settling in Apple Valley, Minnesota with her sister, parents and grandmother. She was in the theater program at Apple Valley High School, and she pursued an English Degree at Columbia University in New York City, graduating in 1995. She returned to Minneapolis and worked as an actress for eight years before deciding to enter the restaurant business.

Culinary career
Recalling the pizza she had enjoyed in New York, Kim began to study pizza making, training at Tony Gemignani's International School of Pizza in San Francisco. In 2011, Kim and her partner (and future husband) Conrad Leifur opened Pizzeria Lola in Minneapolis. When reviewing the restaurant for Food & Wine, Andrew Zimmern said: "Yes, it’s true, Minnesota has the best pizza in America." Guy Fieri visited Pizzeria Lola in 2012 for the Food Network show Diners, Drive-Ins and Dives. In 2012, Kim and Leifur opened a second restaurant in Edina, Minnesota, a smaller pizzeria called Hello Pizza, selling pies and slices from a counter.

In 2016, Kim and Leifur opened a third restaurant named Young Joni in northeast Minneapolis, expanding from pizza to a broader menu featuring hearth cooking and Korean influences. It was named one of the best new restaurants in America by Eater and GQ magazine. The Star Tribune named it its 2017 Restaurant of the Year; the Star Tribune's critic Rick Jones commented that "One of the many reasons why this is such an exciting era for Twin Cities dining can be summed up in two words: Young Joni."

In 2019, Kim won the James Beard Award for Best Chef: Midwest.

Kim opened her fourth restaurant, Sooki & Mimi, in the Uptown neighborhood of Minneapolis in 2021. Focusing on tortillas and other dishes created using masa made from hand-ground nixtamalized corn, the menu was inspired by corn tortillas Kim ate in the Valle de Guadalupe which were so good they brought tears to her eyes.

In 2022, Kim was featured on episode 3 of Netflix's Chef's Table: Pizza, the seventh season of the Chef's Table series. The episode focused on Kim's culinary career in relation to pizza.

References

External links
 Young Joni
 Pizzeria Lola
 Hello Pizza
 Sooki & Mimi

Year of birth missing (living people)
Living people
South Korean emigrants to the United States
People from Apple Valley, Minnesota
Columbia College (New York) alumni
American chefs
American women chefs
James Beard Foundation Award winners
Apple Valley High School (Minnesota) alumni
21st-century American women